Durham Regional Council is the political body for the Regional Municipality of Durham in Ontario, Canada. Created in 1974, it consists of 29 elected representatives, including the Regional Chair. Durham Region is governed by Durham Regional Council, which consists of the mayors of the local municipalities and regional councillors directly elected in each municipality. These members are elected via double direct election. Each municipality elects the following number of regional councillors:

Pickering - 3
Ajax - 3
Whitby - 4
Oshawa - 5
Clarington - 2
Uxbridge - 1
Scugog - 1
Brock - 1

Council Structure
The council is led by a Regional Chair, who is directly elected by the public.  The current Regional Chair is John Henry. In 2006, Pickering, Ajax, and Oshawa placed non-binding referendums on their local election ballots to ask voters whether the chair should be directly elected.  Over 80% voted in the affirmative.

The current council was elected in November 2018.  Council used to sit for a three-year term, but the Ontario Legislature passed legislation increasing the length of municipal council terms in Ontario to four years.

Current Council

Regional Committees, Boards, Subcommittees and Task Forces

 Durham Region Transit Committees
 Finance & Administration Committee
 Health & Social Services Committee
 Planning & Economic Development Committee
 Works Committee
 2014 Municipal Election Compliance Audit Committee
 911 Management Board
 Accessibility Advisory Committee
 Association of Local Public Health Agencies
 Business Advisory Centre Durham
 Canadian National Exhibition Association
 Central Lake Ontario Conservation Authority
 CTC Source Protection Committee
 Development Charges Complaint Committee
 Durham Advisory Committee on Homelessness
 Durham Agricultural Advisory Committee
 Durham Environmental Advisory Committee
 Durham Region Child and Youth Advocate
 Durham Regional Local Housing Corporation
 Durham Region Non-Profit Housing Corporation
 Durham Regional Police Services Board
 Durham Region Roundtable on Climate Change
 East Duffins Headwaters Committee
 Energy from Waste – Waste Management Advisory Committee
 Land Division Committee
 Ganaraska Region Conservation Authority
 Greater Toronto Airports Authority
 Greater Toronto Airports Authority Consultative Committee
 Greater Toronto Marketing Alliance
 GTA Agricultural Action Committee and Golden Horseshoe Food & Farming Alliance
 Kawartha Region Conservation Authority
 Lake Simcoe Region Conservation Authority
 Local Diversity and Immigration Partnership Council
 Royal Agricultural Winter Fair Association
 Toronto and Region Conservation Authority
 TRCA Trail Guidelines Advisory Committee
 Trent Conservation Coalition Source Protection Committee

Services

Services under the region's scope include:

Children Services
Community Planning
Construction
Corporate Services
Economic Strategy and Tourism
Emergency Medical Services - Durham Region EMS - downloaded from the Province of Ontario
Environmental
Financial Department
Forestry
Housing
Legal Services
Long Term Care and Seniors
Public Health and Safety
Real Estate
Planning Services
Regional Property Taxes
Tourism
Transportation Services - regional roads only
Sewers
Employment and Financial Support
Transit - Durham Region Transit
Water
Waste management (garbage, recycling, hazardous waste; excludes curbside collection)
Policing - Durham Regional Police

Regional Chairs

 Gerri-Lynn O'Connor 2018–present
 Roger Anderson 1997–2018
 Jim Witty 1995–1997
 Gary Herrema 1980–1995
 Walter Beath 1974–1980

Durham Regional Headquarters

Durham Regional Offices are located at 605 Rossland Road East in Whitby and is also headquarters for Durham Regional Police.

References
 Regional Municipality of Durham
 Regional Council
 Regional Committees

Durham Region Council
County and regional councils in Ontario